Fransham is a civil parish in the Breckland District of the English county of Norfolk; it covers an area of , and includes the villages of Great and Little Fransham and the hamlet of Crane's End. Fransham has an estimated population of 430 as of 2007.

The local pub in Little Fransham, the Canary and Linnet is just off the A47. Its name derives from  the fact that the village is halfway between Norwich and King's Lynn ('Canaries' and 'Linnets' being the respective nicknames of Norwich City and King's Lynn Town football clubs). Great Fransham had a public house called Chequers which is now a private dwelling.

Great Fransham is served by All Saints church and Little Fransham by St.Marys both in the Benefice of Great Dunham.

There is a commercially working forge with public demonstrations available.

References

External links

Villages in Norfolk
Breckland District
Civil parishes in Norfolk